"Parting Gift" is a song written by American singer Fiona Apple and recorded for her third album Extraordinary Machine (2005). It was produced by Mike Elizondo and Brian Kehew and is the only song from Extraordinary Machine not to have been originally recorded during the Jon Brion-produced sessions. Apple was able to record it on her first take. MTV News described the song as "a characteristically bitter breakup song", and its protagonist chastises a former beau (calling him a "silly, stupid pastime") whilst lamenting their failed relationship: "It ended bad but I loved what we started". 

On August 15, 2005 (see 2005 in music), ahead of the album's release in early October, Epic Records made available for streaming both "Parting Gift" and "O' Sailor" on Apple's official website. The following day, the songs were released for digital download at the online iTunes Music Store. The music video for "Parting Gift" was directed by Spencer Maggart (Apple's brother), and it premiered on LAUNCHcast on August 23, 2005.

Formats and track listing

US Acetate promo CD single:
1. Parting Gift (3:34)

Notes

References
 Perez, Rodrigo. "Fiona Apple's Long-Delayed LP Slotted For October 4 Release". MTV News. August 15, 2005. Retrieved August 31, 2005.
 Cohen, Jonathan. "Fiona Apple fashions a different 'Machine'". Billboard. August 15, 2005. Retrieved August 28, 2005.

External links
 Extraordinary Machine press release from Epic Records — August 15, 2005
 Lyrics

Songs about parting
Fiona Apple songs
2005 singles
Song recordings produced by Mike Elizondo
Songs written by Fiona Apple

es:Parting Gifts